Ravenea nana is a species of flowering plant in the  Arecaceae. It is a palm endemic to Madagascar. It is known from only four locations with a total population of about 100 individuals.

References

nana
Endemic flora of Madagascar
Endangered flora of Africa
Taxonomy articles created by Polbot
Taxa named by Henk Jaap Beentje